In computer science, more precisely in automata theory, a rational set of a monoid is an element of the minimal class of subsets of this monoid that contains all finite subsets and is closed under union, product and Kleene star. Rational sets are useful in automata theory, formal languages and algebra.

A rational set generalizes the notion of rational (regular) language (understood as defined by regular expressions) to monoids that are not necessarily free.

Definition
Let  be a monoid with identity element .
 union: if  then 
 product: if  then 
 Kleene star: if  then  where  is the singleton containing the identity element, and where .

In general a rational subset of a monoid is not a submonoid.

Example
Indeed, the regular languages may be defined by a finite regular expression.

Properties 
McKnight's theorem states that if  is finitely generated then its recognizable subset are rational sets.
This is not true in general, since the whole   is always recognizable but it is not rational if   is infinitely generated.

Rational sets are closed under morphism: given  and  two monoids and  a morphism, if  then .

 is not closed under complement as the following example shows. 
Let , the sets 

The intersection of a rational subset and of a recognizable subset is rational.

For finite groups the following result of A. Anissimov and A. W. Seifert is well known: a subgroup H of a finitely generated group G is recognizable if and only if H has finite index in G. In contrast, H is rational if and only if H is finitely generated.

Rational relations and rational functions
A binary relation between monoids M and N is a rational relation if the graph of the relation, regarded as a subset of M×N is a rational set in the product monoid.  A function from M to N is a rational function if the graph of the function is a rational set.

See also
 Rational series
 Recognizable set
 Rational monoid

References

Jean-Éric Pin, Mathematical Foundations of Automata Theory, Chapter IV: Recognisable and rational sets
Samuel Eilenberg and  M. P. Schützenberger, Rational Sets in Commutative Monoids, Journal of Algebra, 1969.

Further reading 
 

Automata (computation)